Nezdenice is a municipality and village in Uherské Hradiště District in the Zlín Region of the Czech Republic. It has about 700 inhabitants.

History
The first written mention of Nezdenice is from 1374.

References

Villages in Uherské Hradiště District